Following are the statistics of the Danish Championship League in the 1932–33 season.

Overview
It was contested by 10 teams, and Boldklubben Frem won the championship.

League standings

References
Denmark - List of final tables (RSSSF)

Top level Danish football league seasons
Den
1932–33 in Danish football